Emile Mercier may refer to:

 Émile Mercier (archer), French archer and Olympian
 Emile Mercier (cartoonist) (1901–1981), Australian cartoonist